Chanu is a commune in north-western France. Chanu, Chonu or Channu may also refer to
Chanu (name suffix)
Chonu, a village in Iran
Mian Channu Tehsil, an administrative subdivision in Pakistan
Mian Channu, a city and capital of Mian Channu Tehsil
Mian Channu school house bombing in 2009